St. Mary of the Angels is a former Roman Catholic church in Everton, Liverpool, built in 1907. It has magnificent interiors of marble, imported to bring Rome to Liverpool.  The building of the church was funded by Amy Elizabeth Imrie, a Catholic convert and nun, who became an abbess of the Poor Clare Sisters. She was the heiress to the White Star Line shipping fortune when her uncle, William Imrie, died in 1906.

The church is a Grade II Listed Building; its interiors are also listed. The Roman Catholic Archdiocese of Liverpool shut the church in Fox Street in 2001 and has stated that the church will never be reopened. The Archdiocese was prevented by Liverpool City Council in 2002 from stripping the church's Italian High Renaissance-style interior fixtures and fittings.

The Church was rented out to the Whitechapel Centre (a charity supporting the homeless in Liverpool) until 2005 and since 2006 has become a rehearsal space for the Royal Liverpool Philharmonic orchestra, which rebranded the building as "The Friary". It is not accessible to the public.

External links

 Information on church regeneration project
 BBC news article about campaign to save St Mary's
 Thumbnail pictures
 Picture of the church's exterior

References

Church of St Mary of the Angels
Liverpool, Church of St Mary of the Angels
Roman Catholic churches in Liverpool